From the Hills to the Valley is a 1938  Argentine drama film directed by Antonio Ber Ciani. The film premiered in Buenos Aires.

External links

1938 films
1930s Spanish-language films
Argentine black-and-white films
1938 drama films
Argentine drama films
Films directed by Antonio Ber Ciani
1930s Argentine films